Leonidas Panagopoulos (born 3 January 1987) is a Greek footballer who plays as a goalkeeper.

References

External links
 Profile on Universitatea Cluj official site
 

1987 births
Living people
People from Elis
Association football goalkeepers
Greek footballers
Greece under-21 international footballers
Olympiacos F.C. players
Panionios F.C. players
Vyzas F.C. players
CS Turnu Severin players
AFC Săgeata Năvodari players
Super League Greece players
Liga I players
Cypriot First Division players
Greek expatriate footballers
Expatriate footballers in Romania
Expatriate footballers in Cyprus
Greek expatriate sportspeople in Romania
Enosi Panaspropyrgiakou Doxas players
Footballers from Western Greece